Viewzi was a search engine company based in Dallas, Texas that developed a highly visual experience that tailored the way users look at information based on what they are looking for. Users got over 16 "views" for their search including MP3 view (with a list of streaming audio you can play), album view (cover art and related musicians), plus specialized lenses for images, news, and more.

A project that was said to have been in the works for roughly two years, Viewzi, a visual search utility, reached beta stage in April, 2008. Instead of providing a single list of results in a set form for search requests, as Google does, Viewzi provided different “views” that are tailored to the request being made.

Viewzi raised over $2M in seed funding. As of December 28, 2010, Viewzi's website announced that the search engine had not been under development since 2008, and had been closed down.

References

Defunct internet search engines
Internet properties established in 2006
Internet properties disestablished in 2010
Companies based in Dallas
Privately held companies based in Texas